Bernard Berisha (born 24 October 1991) is a Kosovar professional footballer who plays as a left winger or attacking midfielder for Russian club Akhmat Grozny and the Kosovo national team.

Club career

Skënderbeu Korçë
Berisha followed Fatjon Sefa from Besa Kavajë to reigning Albanian champions Skënderbeu Korçë, where he agreed a one-year contract with the club president Ardian Takaj on 27 May 2014. He made his debut with Skënderbeu in the second leg of the 2014–15 UEFA Champions League second qualifying round against Belarusian side BATE Borisov. Berisha was in the starting lineup but was replaced in the 60th minute by Andi Ribaj in the 1–1 draw, which saw BATE Borisov go through on away goals after a goalless first leg. He won the Albanian Supercup in his next game with the club, coming on at half time for fellow Kosovo Albanian Leonit Abazi at half time in the 1–0 win over Flamurtari Vlorë.

On 23 August 2014, Berisha made his Albanian Superliga debut with Skënderbeu at Qemal Stafa Stadium, playing the entire match against the newly promoted club Elbasani, helping the team to win the match 1–0. His Albanian Cup debut would come later, in October against Himara, playing in two legged match, scoring a goal in each of them, with Skënderbeu who passed the round with the aggregate 20–1.

He renewed his contract with Skënderbeu Korçë at the end of the 2014–15 season, signing a new two–year deal to keep him at the club until 2017.

Anzhi Makhachkala

On 13 January 2016, Berisha joined the Russian Football Premier League side Anzhi Makhachkala, on a 3.5-year contract with Anzhi Makhachkala paying a fee of €600.000 to Skënderbeu Korçë. As Russia does not recognize Kosovo as an independent state, he is registered with the Russian league as an Albanian citizen. The club's website, however, states that Berisha is a Kosovo national team footballer.

Terek/Akhmat Grozny
On 26 December 2016, Berisha agreed to join Russian Premier League side Terek Grozny on a 3.5-year contract, there he will play alongside Albania internationals Bekim Balaj and Odise Roshi respectively. On 4 January 2017, the contract was finalized and signed.

On 9 August 2022, Berisha extended his contract with the club (since renamed to Akhmat Grozny) until 2025.

International career
On 7 October 2015. Berisha received a call-up from Kosovo for the friendly match against Equatorial Guinea and made his debut after being named in the starting line-up.

Career statistics

Club

International

Scores and results list goal tally first.
Scores and results list Kosovo's goal tally first, score column indicates score after each Berisha goal.

Honours
Skënderbeu Korçë
Albanian Superliga: 2014–15
Albanian Supercup: 2014

References

External links

1991 births
Living people
Sportspeople from Peja
Association football midfielders
Kosovan footballers
Kosovo international footballers
Football Superleague of Kosovo players
KF Besa players
Kategoria Superiore players
Besa Kavajë players
KF Skënderbeu Korçë players
Russian Premier League players
FC Anzhi Makhachkala players
FC Akhmat Grozny players
Kosovan expatriate footballers
Kosovan expatriate sportspeople in Albania
Expatriate footballers in Albania
Kosovan expatriate sportspeople in Russia
Expatriate footballers in Russia